Dhani Makalani Jones (born February 22, 1978) is a former American football linebacker who played for eleven seasons in the National Football League. He played college football for the Michigan Wolverines, earning All-Big Ten honors for three straight seasons. He was selected by the New York Giants in the sixth round of the 2000 NFL Draft and played for the team for four seasons. Jones also played for the Philadelphia Eagles and the Cincinnati Bengals. In addition to his football career, Jones hosted the Travel Channel series Dhani Tackles the Globe and the VH1 show Ton of Cash. Jones also was on the  CNBC series Adventure Capitalists.

Early years
Jones attended middle school at Cabin John Middle School in Potomac, Maryland, where he played basketball. As a senior at Winston Churchill High School in Potomac, Jones was an All-Met, All-Western Region, and an All-County pick, and also was ranked the fifth best linebacker prospect in the Atlantic Coast Region despite missing most of the regular season with a ruptured disc he injured working out for Penn State earlier in the summer. Jones was also a varsity wrestler in high school, as well as a member of his high school's track team.

College career
At the University of Michigan, Jones was a three time All-Big Ten honoree.  As a sophomore, Jones started nine games at linebacker and finished second on the team with 90 tackles and six sacks, playing alongside Heisman Trophy winner Charles Woodson on Michigan's 1997 national champion squad.  As a junior in 1998, Jones started at linebacker and finished with 72 tackles.  Jones moved to strong side linebacker as a senior in 1999, and finished second on the team with 81 tackles. Jones is a member of Alpha Phi Alpha and is an initiate of the Epsilon chapter at the University of Michigan.

Professional career

New York Giants
Jones was drafted by the New York Giants in the sixth round of the 2000 NFL Draft with the 177th overall pick. He played with the team until 2003.

Philadelphia Eagles
The Philadelphia Eagles acquired Jones from the Giants as a free agent in 2004.  During Jones stint with the Eagles, he started in Super Bowl XXXIX.  On April 30, 2007 the Eagles released Jones.

New Orleans Saints
On July 6, 2007, Jones signed with the New Orleans Saints, where he was thought to be able to push for a starting job.  Jones, however, was released on September 1, 2007 during final roster cutdowns.

Cincinnati Bengals
On September 19, 2007 Jones signed a one-year contract with the Bengals. In the 2008 offseason, Jones signed a 3-year contract to return to the Bengals. Following the 2010 season, Jones' contract expired and he was not issued a new contract, so he became a free agent.

Jones retired in October 2011.

Post-playing career

Dhani Tackles the Globe
Jones was the star of Dhani Tackles the Globe, a series for the Travel Channel in which he learns how to play international sports that are unknown to most Americans.  For example, in the first season he played rugby union for English club, Blackheath. The show ran for two seasons.

Adventure Capitalists
Jones was a host/investor on the series Adventure Capitalists. This series first aired on August 22, 2016 on CNBC. Jones and other investors listen to pitches and try out products from new entrepreneurs. Jones and the other investors decided if they would like to invest in the entrepreneurs outdoor/adventure company.

Business ventures
In 2010, Jones opened the Bow Tie Cafe in the historic Mount Adams neighborhood of Cincinnati, which sells coffee, drinks, cafe sandwiches.

Jones is a partner of VMG Creative, a New York City creative agency, with clients such as Michael Kors, Capital One, Estee Lauder, P&G.

Jones founded a creative agency, Proclamation, based in Cincinnati, and is chairman of Qey Capital Partners, an investment fund, both based in Cincinnati.

Dhani Jones is the CEO of Petram Data, a Company that uses pre-trained AI Models to reduce marketing spend and improve customer retention

Personal life
In addition to his prowess as a professional athlete, Jones has shown a variety of skills off the field.  Jones founded a company that sells high-end bowties, and he also wrote movie reviews and commentary for Page 2 on ESPN.com.

Jones is also an avid cyclist, using his fixed-gear bicycle to commute to practices and games throughout the year. He also participated in the cycling leg of the Durham Doughman Challenge on Travel Channel's Man v. Food. The challenge was a team quadrathlon consisting of running, swimming, cycling and food eating.

On June 7, 2011, Jones' book, The Sportsman: Unexpected Lessons from an Around-the-World Sports Odyssey, was released. The book talks about his experiences in football, travel, and life in general.

Jones is committed to several Cincinnati, OH charities and nonprofits. Among other positions, he serves on the boards of Breakthrough Cincinnati and the Cincinnati Art Museum.  Jones founded a philanthropic organization, BowTie Cause, in 2010.

Television
Dhani Tackles the Globe (2009–2010) – Host – Travel Channel
Timeless – Host – ESPN
Ton of Cash (2011) – Host – VH1
Playbook360 (2011-2016) - Host - Spike
GT Academy (2012–2014) – Host – Spike TV
Spartan: Ultimate Team Challenge (2016–2017 ) – Host – NBC
Adventure Capitalists (2016–2017) – Host – CNBC

References

External links
 Cincinnati Bengals bio
 Dhani Tackles the Globe on the Travel Channel
 
 Bowtie Cafe
 VMG Creative
 InLeague.com Bio
 Proclamation
 Qey Capital
 BowTie Cause

1978 births
Living people
African-American players of American football
American football linebackers
Cincinnati Bengals players
Michigan Wolverines football players
New Orleans Saints players
New York Giants players
Notre Dame Fighting Irish football announcers
People from Potomac, Maryland
Philadelphia Eagles players
Players of American football from Maryland
Players of American football from San Diego
Sportspeople from Montgomery County, Maryland
Sportspeople from the Washington metropolitan area
American game show hosts